This page shows the discography of pop singer Theo Tams.

Albums

Studio albums

Extended plays

Singles

Music videos

Tours
 2008: Canadian Idols LIVE! Tour 2008
 2009: Give It All Away Tour
 2010: Taking It All Back Tour

References

External links
 Theo Tams

Discographies of Canadian artists